Jim Émilien Ngowet Allevinah (born 27 February 1995) is a professional footballer who plays as a midfielder for  club Clermont. Born in France, he represents Gabon at the international level.

International career 
Born in France, Allevinah elected to represent Gabon at the senior international level. He made his international debut on 23 March 2019 against Burundi, starting and playing the full 90 minutes of the 1–1 draw, which eliminated Gabon from Africa Cup of Nations qualification.

On 5 September 2021, he scored his first goal in a 1–1 draw against Egypt in a FIFA World Cup qualifier. Two months later, he scored against Egypt again in the reverse fixture, which Egypt won 2–1.

Allevinah was selected for Gabon's 2021 Africa Cup of Nations squad. He played in all three of Gabon's group stage matches, scoring a late equalizer against Ghana and the opening goal of the draw against Morocco to help Gabon advance to the knockout stage.

Career statistics

Club

International 

As of match played 23 January 2022. Gabon score listed first, score column indicates score after each Allevinah goal.

References

External links 
 
 

1995 births
French sportspeople of Gabonese descent
People with acquired Gabonese citizenship
Living people
Gabonese footballers
French footballers
Gabon international footballers
Association football forwards
Association football midfielders
Aviron Bayonnais FC players
Le Puy Foot 43 Auvergne players
Clermont Foot players
Ligue 1 players
Ligue 2 players
Championnat National 2 players
Championnat National 3 players
2021 Africa Cup of Nations players
Black French sportspeople